Oschmann is a German surname. Notable people with the surname include:

Ingo Oschmann (born 1969), German comedian, entertainer, stage magician, television presenter, and actor
Stefan Oschmann (born 1957), German businessman, CEO and chairman of Merck Group

German-language surnames